is the Japanese fifth tier of league football, which is part of the Japanese Regional Leagues. It covers the prefecture/region of Hokkaidō.

Hokkaido is the only regional league whose clubs have never been promoted. The top representative of Hokkaido in the Japanese league system, Consadole Sapporo, entered the J.League from the Kanto region in 1995.

Overview 
The Hokkaido Soccer League is the fifth tier in the Japanese soccer structure and the block leagues below corresponds to the sixth tier. 
There are four block leagues under the Hokkaido Soccer League, and district-based leagues are established under them. Currently, as of 2022, there are fifteen district leagues under the four main block leagues.

Eight teams from all over Hokkaido participate in the competition, and the winners participate in the Regional Football League Competition. There is relegation to the Block leagues below this level, usually the teams that finish in the bottom two places in the league standings are relegated.

Hokkaido is the only prefecture participating in this league, but it is treated as a regional league. In Hokkaido, the block league is the equivalent of the prefectural league that exists in other prefectures.

District associations and divisions

2023 clubs

Hokkaido Soccer League Champions

External links
 Hokkaido Football Association official website
 Hokkaido Senior Soccer Federation official website

Football leagues in Japan